William Dale Goodman (March 22, 1926 – October 1, 1984) was an American Major League Baseball (MLB) infielder who played 16 seasons for the Boston Red Sox, Baltimore Orioles, Chicago White Sox, and Houston Colt .45s, from 1947 through 1962. Goodman was inducted posthumously into the Boston Red Sox Hall of Fame in November .

Goodman was an outstanding hitter and fielder, he was one of the most versatile players of his era. He played every position in the major leagues except catcher and pitcher and was an All-Star for two seasons. In 1950, he won the American League (AL) batting title  hitting .354 with 68 runs batted in (RBI) and was the AL Most Valuable Player runner-up to New York Yankees shortstop Phil Rizzuto (hit .324 with 66 RBI). Goodman batted over .290 in eleven seasons including over .300 in five seasons. In 1959, he hit .304, helping the White Sox win the AL Pennant championship. His career .376 on-base percentage made him an ideal lead-off hitter.

Early years

Minor league
Goodman hit .336 his first season in Atlanta. While assigned to the Pacific Theater on Ulithi with Major Leaguer Mickey Vernon and future Baseball Hall of Famer, Larry Doby, both Goodman and Vernon encouraged Doby to become a Major League baseball player.

On February 8, he was sold to the Boston Red Sox. Goodman entered his first Spring training battling Sam Mele for the open right field job. With Mele winning the job, Goodman batted .182 in limited play through May of the  season before being reassigned to the American Association's Louisville Colonels, where he batted .340 over the remainder of the season.

MLB career

Boston Red Sox

1947–1948
Goodman spent the spring with the Red Sox in  playing in 12 games, 2 in the outfield, and 10 filling in at second base for an injured Bobby Doerr, He made his first start as a Major League third baseman on May 20, . From there, Goodman moved across the diamond to first base for the remainder of the season in the Majors. He batted .310 with 66 runs batted in as a rookie. His first Major League home run, and only home run of the season, was a grand slam off the Detroit Tigers' Virgil Trucks.

1949–1950
Early in the  season, Goodman suffered a chip fracture in his left ankle that cost him a month of play. Power hitting rookie first baseman Walt Dropo earned himself a place in the everyday starting line-up in Goodman's absence, batting .348 with ten home runs and 33 RBIs. Goodman found himself without a starting position upon his return, however, injuries to Bobby Doerr and third baseman Johnny Pesky kept Goodman in the line-up semi-regularly. After Ted Williams injured himself in the All-Star game, Goodman took over in left field for the Bosox, and batted .338 with 23 RBIs filling in for the Boston legend. Playing five different positions over the course of the season, Goodman logged enough at-bats to win the American League batting title with a .354 batting average (Stan Musial, National League, .346) with 68 RBI and was the runner-up in AL Most Valuable Player Award balloting to New York Yankees shortstop, Phil Rizzuto who hit .324 with 66 RBI; Yankee catcher Yogi Berra finished 3rd in the voting hitting .322 with 124 RBI.

1951–1953
He began the season playing first base when Dropo fractured his right wrist. He shifted over to right field upon Dropo's return, but was back at first when Dropo was optioned to the Pacific Coast League's San Diego Padres at the end of June for "more work." He spent most of the month of August at second base when Bobby Doerr's bad back kept him out of the line-up. In all, Goodman played five different positions, and batted .297 with 50 RBIs and 92 runs scored. His 638 plate appearances were third highest on the team behind Dom DiMaggio and Ted Williams.

He was elected to start the All-Star Game as a second baseman that season despite being sidelined for a month by one of the more bizarre baseball injuries. While arguing with first base umpire Jim Duffy, Goodman was restrained by teammate Jim Piersall. Piersall pulled Goodman toward the dugout, and in doing so, strained Goodman's rib cartilage.

1954–1957
In , Goodman returned to his "jack of all trades" role with the Bosox. After starting the season at second, he moved over to third when the Sox traded George Kell to the Chicago White Sox. He moved to left field when Ted Williams was sidelined by a virus infection in his right lung. Upon Williams' return, he began platooning at first with Harry Agganis (despite the fact that both were left-handed batters) until he was shifted back to second base in the beginning of August.

Both were career highs, as were his 176 hits and 99 walks. He began losing playing time to Ted Lepcio at second base toward the end of the  season. He was relegated to pinch hitting duties early in the  season before a mid-season trade sent him to the Baltimore Orioles for pitcher Mike Fornieles.

The Rookie
During his time with the Red Sox, Goodman was one of the players featured in the 1957 Norman Rockwell painting The Rookie.

Baltimore Orioles
Goodman was immediately inserted into the starting line-up in Baltimore, and hit a home run in his first game as an Oriole. He mostly played third base, filling in for an injured George Kell, but also played first, second, short, left field and right field. He batted .308 with three home runs and 33 RBIs in 73 games for the Orioles. At the end of the season, he, Tito Francona and Ray Moore were dealt to the Chicago White Sox for Larry Doby, Jack Harshman and Jim Marshall. Chicago later sent pitcher Russ Heman to Baltimore as part of this deal when it was discovered by the Orioles that Harshman was suffering from a slipped disc.

Chicago White Sox

In 1958, with Nellie Fox at second base, Goodman shifted to third with the White Sox. He was sidelined by a knee injury for most of the month of May. Upon his return, he quickly shot up among the American League leaders in batting, with his average peaking at .336 in late July.

At 33 years old at the start of the  season, Goodman was used in a lefty-righty platoon with Bubba Phillips at third base. The 1959 White Sox reached the World Series for the first time since the infamous  World Series. It was also the first and only World Series of Goodman's career. Goodman appeared in five of the six games of the  World Series, driving in and scoring one run in the White Sox's 11-0 game one victory. He also went two-for-three in game three, and was hit by a pitch in the eighth inning to load the bases with the White Sox down by two runs (they ended up scoring one). Overall, he batted .231 (3-for-13) in Chicago's six game loss to the Los Angeles Dodgers.

After the season, the White Sox made him available for the 1960 Major League Baseball expansion draft, but he went unselected. Instead, he remained with the franchise for two more seasons, in which he batted a combined .242 with one home run and sixteen RBIs in 71 games. After holding out over a salary dispute at the start of Spring training , he was released by the White Sox just as the season was set to start.

Houston Colt .45s
Goodman joined the Houston Colt .45s in 1962, playing in 49 games into their inaugural season, and went two-for-five with two runs scored in his first game as a Colt 45. Overall, he batted .255 in 82 games for the Colt .45s, while playing first, second, and third base.

Player-manager
In , he became a player-manager for the Colts' Carolina League affiliate, the Durham Bulls, and batted .354 with six home runs, the most home runs he had ever hit in any season at any level. The following season, he appeared on the mound for two games (7 innings) with Durham, leaving catcher as the only position he never played professionally. In three seasons, he had a combined 184-228 record for a .447 winning percentage.

Scout and instructor

Later years
He died on October 1, 1984 after a year-long battle with cancer.

Major League stats

Goodman had five 5-hit games in his career. His best playing position according to fielding percentage was .991 at first base; in 1949, he led the AL with a .992 fielding average at first base.

See also

 List of Major League Baseball batting champions

References

External links

 Billy Goodman at SABR (Baseball BioProject)
 

1926 births
1984 deaths
American League All-Stars
American League batting champions
Atlanta Braves coaches
Atlanta Crackers players
Baltimore Orioles players
Baseball players from North Carolina
Boston Red Sox players
Boston Red Sox scouts
Chicago White Sox players
Deaths from cancer in Florida
Deaths from multiple myeloma
Durham Bulls managers
Durham Bulls players
Houston Colt .45s players
Louisville Colonels (minor league) players
Major League Baseball first base coaches
Major League Baseball first basemen
Major League Baseball second basemen
People from Concord, North Carolina
United States Navy personnel of World War II